Ghatghar Dam refers to two associated gravity dams built using roller-compacted concrete, the first use in India. They are situated in Ghatghar village in Ahmednagar district Maharashtra, India. Both dams create a lower and upper reservoir for the 250 MW pumped-storage hydroelectric power station. The hydro power project diverts Godavari river basin water outside the basin area to a west flowing river of Western ghats.

The power station is located between both the upper and lower reservoirs. During peak electricity demand hours, water from the upper reservoir turns two 125 MW reversible Francis turbine-generators. When energy demand is low, such as at night, the turbines reverse direction and pump water from the lower reservoir back to the upper. Construction on the project began in 1995, the dams were placed beginning in 2001 and were complete by 2006. The power station was commissioned in 2008.

Power Plant
The dam's power plant has an installed capacity of 250 MW.

See also

Middle Vaitarna Dam

References

Hydroelectric power stations in Maharashtra
Dams in Ahmednagar district
Dams completed in 2006
Energy infrastructure completed in 2008
Pumped-storage hydroelectric power stations in India
Gravity dams
Roller-compacted concrete dams
2006 establishments in Maharashtra